Cannonball House may refer to:
 Cannonball House (Edinburgh), Castlehill, Edinburgh
 Cannonball House Maritime Museum, Lewes, Delaware
 Cannonball House (Macon, Georgia), listed on the NRHP in Georgia
 Cannonball House (Saint Michaels, Maryland), listed on the NRHP in Maryland